Johnson Asiedu Nketiah is a Ghanaian politician and Chairman of the National Democratic Congress (NDC). He is noted to be the longest serving General Secretary of the NDC.

Early life and family 
Asiedu Nketiah was born in Seikwa B/A in the Wenchi Municipal District which was then part of Ashanti Region but now in the Bono Region of Ghana on December 24, 1956, to Nana Kwaku Asiedu, a farmer from the Oyoko Royal family and Madam Hagar Akosua Afrah of the Akwamu Royal family. He is the fifth child of nine children.

Education 
Mr Asiedu Nketiah had his basic education at Seikwa Presbyterian Primary School. He then proceeded to train as a teacher at St. Joseph’s College of Education in Bechem from 1974 to 1978 where he graduated a trainee teacher in 1978.

He began his career as a professional teacher at Seketia Presby Primary in the Jaman North District of the Bono region.  He gained admission to the University of Ghana Business School in 1983 to read a Bachelor of Science Degree in Business Administration (Banking and Finance option).

Nketiah was a member of the pioneer batch for a Post Graduate Training Programme in Stock Brokerage and Investment Analysis when the Ghana Stock Exchange was introduced. He obtained a Master of Science Degree in Defense and International Politics from the Ghana Armed Forces Command College in 2019.

Career 
Aseidu Nketia has worked at GIHOC Distilleries Company Limited. He then worked as a manager for the Nkoraman Rural Bank, and Sehwi Asawinso Rural Bank as trainee manager. He has also worked with  the National Trust Holding Company Limited (NTHC) as a stockbroker and an investment banker.

Politics 
As a member of the Ghanaian parliament Aseidu Nketia has worked on the Appointments Committee, Finance Committee and Public Accounts Committee. He has been a Chairman – Mines and Energy Committee, Ranking Member for Food and Agriculture and Cocoa Affairs Committee and Deputy Majority Chief Whip. He was Deputy Minister for Food and Agriculture in charge of crops under the Jerry John Rawlings administration.

At the National Democratic Congress' delegate congress in December 2005, Nketiah won with about 80% of the votes against Bede Ziedeng, Mr Sylvester Mensah and Mr Antwi Boasiako to become the 3rd General Secretary of the NDC. He was re-elected for the position in January 2010, and 2014.

He was elected into the first parliament of the fourth republic of Ghana on 7 January 1993 after being pronounced winner at the 1992 Ghanaian election held on 29 December 1992. In 2020 December elections petition he was crossed examined along with Rojo Mettle-Nunoo.

1996 Ghanaian general elections 
He was re-elected into the 2nd parliament of the 4th republic of Ghana represented during the 1996 Ghanaian general election on the ticket of the National Democratic Congress. He defeated Obeng Manu Jnr. of the New Patriotic Party by obtaining 41.60% of the total valid votes cast which was equivalent to 19,386 votes while Obeng obtained 19.10% which was equivalent to 8,905 votes.

2000 Ghanaian general elections 
In the year 2000, Asiedu Nketia won the Ghanaian general elections as the member of parliament for the Wenchi West constituency of the Brong Ahafo Region of Ghana. He won on the ticket of the National Democratic Congress. His constituency was a part of the 7 parliamentary seats out of 21 seats won by the National Democratic Congress in that election for the Brong Ahafo Region.

The National Democratic Congress won a minority total of 92 parliamentary seats out of 200 seats in the 3rd parliament of the 4th republic of Ghana. He was elected with 11,720 votes out of 24,531 total valid votes cast. This was equivalent to 49.2% of the total valid votes cast. He was elected over Joe Danquah of the New Patriotic Party, Kusi Edward Kofi of the National Reform Party and Joana Mayfair Abebrese of the Convention People’s Party. These won 11,041, 542, and 507 votes respectively out of the total valid votes cast. These were equivalent to 46.4%, 2.3% and 2.1% respectively of total valid votes cast.

International politics 
In 2017, Mr Asiedu Nketiah was elected Vice President of Socialist International in absentia at Cartagena to succeed the former Prime Minister of Portugal and current UN General Secretary, António Guterres. He was elected to serve under the current President of the Organization, George Papandroeu, who doubles as the Prime Minister of Greece.

Personal life 
He is a Christian and a member of the Presbyterian Church of Ghana.  He is married to Mrs. Vida Adomah Asiedu Nketiah, and has five (5) children.

References 

1956 births
Living people
National Democratic Congress (Ghana) politicians
Government ministers of Ghana
People from Brong-Ahafo Region
University of Ghana alumni
Ghanaian Presbyterians
Ghanaian MPs 1993–1997
Ghanaian MPs 1997–2001
Ghanaian MPs 2001–2005